The Shadow Effect is a 2017 American action thriller film directed by Obin Olson and Amariah Olson, starring Cam Gigandet, Jonathan Rhys Meyers and Michael Biehn.  The film was released by Momentum Pictures on On Demand, Digital HD and DVD on May 2, 2017.

Plot
A US senator is assassinated and his guards are killed by an assassin. He then blows himself and some other guards up with a grenade. Gabriel wakes up with nightmares every day. His wife Brinn comforts him. They run a restaurant together, and are good friends with Sheriff Dodge. Gabe has memories of the Senator's assassination. One day, Gabe hears music and has a seizure. Later, a politician and his wife are in a boat. Gabe disguises like the assassin to fights the politician and falls off the boat. Gabe kills him, then blows himself up. He wakes up in his home to memories of the assassination. Brinn takes him to a doctor (Rhys Meyers), who gives him some medication. Gabe later hears the same music. He becomes like a robot. A man gives him a list with the name of a target. Gabe goes to the target at a subway and pushes him in front of a train, causing a cop to chase him. Gabe kills the cop then blows himself up, then he wakes up with this memory. He goes to the location where the cop died to find a finger exactly as same as his own. Dodge appears and kills him. Gabe wakes up. He doesn't take the doctor's medication. He hears the same music but gets control. The Man gives Gabe another list, and he pretends to follow the instructions. Gabe goes to the target but instead kills Dodge's men who traced him. Dodge chases Gabe, but he escapes. He confronts the Meyers, and Dodge arrives there too. Gabe drives home to realise Brinn is on it too: she is not his wife but fell in love with him. Dodge appears and kills him. Gabe wakes up in a hospital room being checked up by a doctor. He kills the doctor and a guard and confronts Meyers. Meyers' wife had died, and he built a program to recreate human clones. Gabe was their perfect killing machine, but somehow, each new Gabe recovers memories of the previous ones. Gabe is revealed to be a clone of a deceased Special Forces soldier; Dodge was his commander. Dodge appears with some men. Meyers escapes, and Gabe gets injured. Brinn arrives to help Gabe, and they kill Dodge's men. Gabe is about to die, but Brinn breaks out a new body of Gabe. As Gabe dies, the new Gabe awakes. Dodge uses the music to control Gabe but he gets control and kills Dodge. The place is about to explode, and he gets Brinn in an elevator and sacrifices himself to get the elevator up. Meyers meets with the Man to discuss the closing of the project. A few days later, Gabe wakes up to the music again in an apartment.

Cast
Cam Gigandet
Jonathan Rhys Meyers
Brit Shaw
Michael Biehn

Filming
The film was shot in Atlanta, Georgia.

References

External links
 
 

2017 films
2017 action thriller films
American action thriller films
Films about cloning
2010s English-language films
2010s American films